The Group of Asia and the Pacific Small Island Developing States (often shortened as Asia and the Pacific or Asia-Pacific Group) is one of the five United Nations regional groups and is composed of 53 Member States from Asia and Oceania.

The Group, as with all the regional groups, is a non-binding dialogue group where subjects concerning regional and international matters are discussed. Additionally, the Group works to help allocate seats on United Nations bodies by nominating candidates from the region.

Member States 

The following are the Member States of the Asia and the Pacific Group:

 
 
 
 
 
 
 
 
  Democratic People's Republic of Korea
 
 
 
 
 
 
 
 
 
 
 
 
 
 
 
 
 
 
 
 
 
 
 
 
  
 
 
 
  Republic of Korea

History

League of Nations 
The precedent of the geographic distribution of seats was set by the United Nation's predecessor, the League of Nations. Under the League's system, a Nomination's Committee was created in order to create election slates for distribution of seats in the Council of the League.

This proved a difficult task as the number of seats was on the council was constantly changing. However, from 1926 to 1933 an unofficial pattern of distribution emerged where the non-permanent seats on the council were distributed along the following lines:
 3 for Latin American states
 1 for a Scandinavian state
 1 for a Little Entente state (Czechoslovakia, Romania or Yugoslavia)
 1 for a member of the British Commonwealth
 1 for a Far Eastern state
 1 seat each for Spain and Poland

Under this system, members from the current Asia and the Pacific Group only had two guaranteed seats on the council, the Far East seat and Japan's permanent seat.

United Nations 
During the drafting of the United Nations Charter, the idea of geographic distribution of seats of the new organisation's bodies was one of the priorities of the drafters. On the United States' recommendation, the very first General Committee of the United Nations was composed of:
 The five permanent members of the Security Council
 3 Latin American states 
 2 British Commonwealth states
 2 Eastern European states
 1 Western European state
 1 Middle Eastern state

This distribution began the precedent of using regional groups for the allocation of seats in United Nations bodies. For example, the first election to the Economic and Social Council used a similar scheme, allocating seats along the following lines:
 The five permanent members of the Security Council
 4 Latin American states
 2 British Commonwealth states
 3 Eastern European states
 2 Western European states
 2 Near East states

However, these arrangements were not formal and were based on "Gentlemen's Agreements."

Reform 
Following a wave of decolonisation, there were multiple admissions into the United Nations from Asian and Pacific states. After the Bandung Conference in 1955, there was increasing solidarity among post-colonial states which led to pressure being put on the United Nations for increased representation of these states. This pressure led to  Resolution 1192 (XII) of 12 December 1957. This resolution established a formal pattern for distribution of seats on the General Committee awarding four for Asian and African states.

Continued pressure eventually also led to reform of the Security Council and the Economic and Social Council with the passage of Resolution 1991 (XVIII) of 17 December 1963. This resolution formally set up a pattern for the election of members to the Security Council and stipulated that five seats were to be allocated to African and Asian states. It also formally set up a pattern for the election of members to the Economic and Social Council and allocated seven seats for African and Asian states.

Present 
After continued decolonisation and an increase in membership of the United Nations, the groups were again modified in 1964. Prior to this African and Asian states were included in the same group. However, theses two regions were split with each one receiving its own group. This split allowed even more geographical distribution of seats among the Member States in different UN bodies.

At its creation, the Group was simply known as the Asia Group. However, by the 1970s, Pacific island nations were gaining independence and joining the group. By the mid-2000s the number of Pacific island nations in the group had reached over one fifth of the membership, so they began to advocate for a change of name of the Group.

These efforts were met with success in 2011 when the United Nations agreed to include "Pacific" in the name of the Group, changing it to the Group of Asia and the Pacific Small Island Developing States at China's insistence. This change in name recognises the growing role Pacific island nations play in the United Nations System.

Representation

Security Council 
The Asia and the Pacific Group holds 3 seats on the Security Council, 2 non-permanent and 1 permanent. The current members of the Security Council from the Group are:

Economic and Social Council 
The Asia and the Pacific Group holds 11 seats on the United Nations Economic and Social Council. The current members of the Economic and Social Council from the Group are:

Human Rights Council 
The Asia-Pacific Group holds 13 seats on the United Nations Human Rights Council. The current members of the Economic and Social Council from the Group are:

Presidency of the General Assembly 
Every five years in the years ending in 1 and 6, the Asia-Pacific Group is eligible to elect a president to the General Assembly.

The following is a list of presidents from the region since its official creation in 1963:

Timeline of membership 
As the Group of Asia and The Pacific Small Island Developing States changed significantly over time, the number of its members had also changed.

See also
 United Nations Regional Groups
 List of members of the United Nations Security Council
 List of members of the United Nations Economic and Social Council

References

Notes

External links 
 Records of the Department of General Assembly and Conference Management (DGACM) (2002-present) at the United Nations Archives
The Regional Groups via the Department of General Assembly and Conference Management

United Nations coalitions and unofficial groups